The Veer is a smartphone announced by HP on February 9, 2011. The device uses HP webOS, is powered by a Qualcomm Snapdragon processor, and has a 2.6-inch screen. The smartphone is notable for its credit card-sized dimensions (and a depth that is comparable to the size of a deck of cards). The device is seen as the successor in the Palm line-up to the Pixi and earlier Centro models.

History
The HP Veer was announced on February 9, 2011, along with the HP Pre 3 and the HP TouchPad. The Veer was released in the US on May 15, 2011 on the AT&T network, and was marketed as the HP Veer 4G. The device was slated to support the Touch-to-Share proximity-based sharing feature through a later update, but no official update supporting Touch-to-Share has been released although several users have purchased devices on eBay with fully implemented Touch-to-Share and SMS sharing support.

Following HP's announcement on August 18 that it would cease development of all WebOS hardware, the Veer was discontinued, and similar to the TouchPad, the price was lowered significantly in a firesale.

Hardware

Processors
The HP Veer is powered by a Qualcomm Snapdragon MSM7230 which is a system-on-a-chip made by Qualcomm based on a 45 nanometer CMOS process. The Veer's own Snapdragon is composed, principally, of the Scorpion CPU, running at 800Mhz, an Adreno 205 GPU, a digital signal processor for cellular transmission/reception/processing (GSM, UMTS), gpsOne GPS module and an audio subsystem.

The Scorpion core implements the ARMv7 architecture which is similar to the ARM Cortex-A8 and supports the ARM NEON instruction set extensions and VFPv3 floating-point extensions (both referred as the “VeNum” media processing engine on Scorpion) which can accelerate, for example, image processing (camera). The main purpose of the VeNum engine is to boost the performance of the Scorpion CPU during multimedia processing resulting in power saving. The same task will be completed faster and with less power being consumed on a processor with VeNum media processing engine than one without.

The Adreno 205 GPU supports OpenGL ES 2.0, OpenGL ES 1.1, OpenVG 1.1, EGL 1.3, Direct3D Mobile, SVGT 1.2 and DirectDraw.

Screen and input
The HP Veer has a 66 mm (2.6 inch) capacitive touchscreen with a resolution of 320 x 400 pixel. The touchscreen is designed for a bare finger, or multiple fingers for multi-touch sensing. An accelerometer allows the orientation of the screen to change between portrait and landscape mode. There is a proximity sensor which deactivates the display and touchscreen when the device is brought near the face during a call.

There is a slide-out 4-row QWERTY keyboard. 

The microphone is located on the slide-out keyboard.

Buttons
On the left side of the device, there is a volume button. On the upper right side, there is a power button. On the top side, there is a ringer switch for vibration mode.

Audio and USB connectivity
Both USB and 3.5 mm connectivities are provided by a proprietary magnetic connector.

Battery and SIM
The battery is rated at 910 mAh and is non-removable. HP states that it provides up to 5.0 hours of talk time or 300 hours of standby time.

Storage
There is 8 GB on board, of which about 6.5 GB is available to the user. There is no microSD card socket.

Software

The Veer shipped with either webOS 2.1.1 or 2.1.2 depending on region and has not seen an official update since.
It has the following pre-installed applications.

Android has unoffically been ported as well.

References

Veer
WebOS
Smartphones
Mobile phones with an integrated hardware keyboard